The Isle of Man (also  ), also known as Mann, is a self-governing Crown Dependency in the Irish Sea between Great Britain and Ireland. As head of state, Charles III holds the title Lord of Mann and is represented by a Lieutenant Governor. The government of the United Kingdom is responsible for the isle's military defence and represents it abroad.

Humans have lived on the island since before 6500 BC. Gaelic cultural influence began in the 5th century AD, when Irish missionaries following the teaching of St. Patrick began settling the island, and the Manx language, a branch of the Goidelic languages, emerged. In 627, King Edwin of Northumbria conquered the Isle of Man along with most of Mercia. In the 9th century, Norsemen established the thalassocratic Kingdom of the Isles, which included the Isle of Man. Magnus III, King of Norway from 1093 to 1103, reigned as King of Mann and the Isles between 1099 and 1103.

In 1266, King Magnus VI of Norway sold his suzerainty over Mann to King Alexander III of Scotland under the Treaty of Perth. After a period of alternating rule by the Kings of Scotland and England, the island came under the feudal lordship of the English Crown in 1399. The lordship revested in the British Crown in 1765, but the island did not become part of the 18th-century Kingdom of Great Britain, nor of its successors, the United Kingdom of Great Britain and Ireland and the present-day United Kingdom of Great Britain and Northern Ireland. It has always retained its internal self-government. In 1881, the Isle of Man Parliament, Tynwald, became the first national legislative body in the world to give women the right to vote in a general election, although this excluded married women.

The Manx economy is bolstered by its status as a tax haven and offshore banking destination. Insurance and online gambling each generate 17% of the GNP, followed by information and communications technology and banking with 9% each. This status has also brought the  problems of money laundering, financial crime, and terrorism financing.

Internationally, the Isle of Man is known for the TT Motorcycle Races, and the Manx cat, a breed with short or no tails. In 2016, UNESCO awarded the Isle of Man biosphere reserve status.

Name 
The short form used in English is spelled either Mann or Man.

The name is probably cognate with the Welsh name of the island of Anglesey,
usually derived from a Celtic word for 'mountain' (reflected in Welsh , Breton , and Scottish Gaelic ),
from a Proto-Celtic *moniyos.

The name was at least secondarily associated with that of Manannán mac Lir in Irish mythology (corresponding to Welsh ). In the earliest Irish mythological texts, Manannán is a king of the otherworld, but the 9th-century Sanas Cormaic identifies a euhemerised Manannán as "a famous merchant who resided in, and gave name to, the Isle of Man". Later, a Manannán is recorded as the first king of Mann in a Manx poem (dated 1504).

History 

The island was cut off from the surrounding islands around 8000 BC as sea levels rose following the end of the ice age. Humans colonised it by travelling by sea some time before 6500 BC. The first occupants were hunter-gatherers and fishermen. Examples of their tools are kept at the Manx Museum.

The Neolithic Period marked the beginning of farming, and the people began to build megalithic monuments, such as Cashtal yn Ard near Maughold, King Orry's Grave at Laxey, Mull Hill near Cregneash, and Ballaharra Stones at St John's. There were also the local Ronaldsway and Bann cultures.

During the Bronze Age, the size of burial mounds decreased. The people put bodies into stone-lined graves with ornamental containers. The Bronze Age burial mounds survived as long-lasting markers around the countryside.

The ancient Romans knew of the island and called it . During the four centuries when Rome ruled the Province of Britannia, the Roman military controlled the Irish Sea, providing safe passage of agricultural goods from the productive farms of Anglesey to Roman settlements at the English – Scottish frontier. Only a few Roman artifacts have been found on Mann, suggesting a lack of strategic value of Mann during the era of Britannia. No Roman lighthouses or signal towers have yet been found on Mann.

Around the 5th century AD, large-scale migration from Ireland precipitated a process of Gaelicisation, evidenced by Ogham inscriptions, and the Manx language developed. It is a Goidelic language closely related to Irish and Scottish Gaelic.

In the 7th century, Mann came under Anglo-Saxon control, specifically King Edwin of Northumbria, from which he launched raids into Ireland. How much influence the Northumbrians exerted on Mann is unknown, but very few place names on Mann are of Old English origin.

Vikings arrived at the end of the 8th century. They established Tynwald and introduced many land divisions that still exist. In 1266 King Magnus VI of Norway ceded the islands to Alexander III, King of Scots, in the Treaty of Perth. But Scottish rule over Mann did not become firmly established until 1275, when the Manx were defeated in the Battle of Ronaldsway, near Castletown.

In 1290 King Edward I of England sent Walter de Huntercombe to take possession of Mann. It remained in English hands until 1313, when Robert I, King of Scots, took it after besieging Castle Rushen for five weeks. In 1314, it was retaken for the English by John Bacach of Argyll. In 1317, it was retaken for the Scots by Thomas Randolph, 1st Earl of Moray and Lord of the Isle of Man. It was held by the Scots until 1333. For some years thereafter control passed back and forth between the two kingdoms until the English took it for the final time in 1346. The English Crown delegated its rule of the island to a series of lords and magnates. Tynwald passed laws concerning the government of the island in all respects and had control over its finances, but was subject to the approval of the Lord of Mann.

In 1866, the Isle of Man obtained limited home rule, with partly democratic elections to the House of Keys, but the Legislative Council was appointed by the Crown. Since then, democratic government has been gradually extended.

The Isle of Man has designated more than 250 historic sites as registered buildings.

In July 2022 the 19th International Linguistics Olympiad was held in Castletown on the island.

Geography

The Isle of Man is an island located in the middle of the northern Irish Sea, almost equidistant from England to the east, Northern Ireland to the west, and Scotland (closest) to the north; while Wales to the south is almost the distance of the Republic of Ireland to the southwest. Besides the island of Mann itself, the political unit of the Isle of Man includes some nearby small islands: the seasonally inhabited Calf of Man, Chicken Rock (on which stands an unstaffed lighthouse), St Patrick's Isle and St Michael's Isle. The last two of these are connected to the main island by permanent roads/causeways.

Ranges of hills in the north and south are separated by a central valley. The northern plain, by contrast, is relatively flat, consisting mainly of deposits from glacial advances from western Scotland during colder times. There are more recently deposited shingle beaches at the northernmost point, the Point of Ayre. According to an old saying, from the summit one can see six kingdoms: those of Mann, Scotland, England, Ireland, Wales, and Heaven. Some versions add a seventh kingdom, that of the sea, or Neptune.

Population 

At the 2021 census, the Isle of Man was home to 84,069 people, of whom 26,677 resided in the island's capital, Douglas. The population increased by 755 persons between the 2016 and 2021 censuses.

Census 

The Isle of Man Full Census, last held in 2021, has been a decennial occurrence since 1821, with interim censuses being introduced from 1966. It is separate from, but similar to, the Census in the United Kingdom.

Governance 

The United Kingdom is responsible for the island's defence and ultimately for good governance, and for representing the island in international forums, while the island's own parliament and government have competence over all domestic matters.

Socio-political structure 

The island's parliament, Tynwald, is claimed to have been in continuous existence since 979 or earlier, purportedly making it the oldest continuously governing body in the world, though evidence supports a much later date. Tynwald is a bicameral or tricameral legislature, comprising the House of Keys (directly elected by universal suffrage with a voting age of 16 years) and the Legislative Council (consisting of indirectly elected and ex-officio members). These two bodies also meet together in joint session as Tynwald Court.

The executive branch of government is the Council of Ministers, which is composed of Members of Tynwald (usually Members of the House of Keys, though Members of the Legislative Council may also be appointed as Ministers). It is headed by the Chief Minister.

Vice-regal functions of the head of state are performed by a lieutenant governor.

External relations and security 

In various laws of the United Kingdom, "the United Kingdom" is defined to exclude the Isle of Man. Historically, the UK has taken care of its external and defence affairs, and retains paramount power to legislate for the Island. However, in 2007, the Isle of Man and the UK signed an agreement that established frameworks for the development of the international identity of the Isle of Man. There is no separate Manx citizenship. Citizenship is covered by UK law, and Manx people are classed as British citizens. There is a long history of relations and cultural exchange between the Isle of Man and Ireland. The Isle of Man's historic Manx language (and its modern revived variant) are closely related to both Scottish Gaelic and the Irish language, and in 1947, Irish Taoiseach Éamon de Valera spearheaded efforts to save the dying Manx language.

Defence 
The Isle of Man is not part of the United Kingdom; however, the UK takes care of its external and defence affairs. There are no independent military forces on the Isle of Man, although HMS Ramsey is affiliated with the town of the same name. From 1938 to 1955 there was the Manx Regiment of the British Territorial Army, which saw extensive action during the Second World War. During the English Civil War the 7th Earl of Derby and Lord of Mann James Stanley conscripted 10 men from each parish (170 in total) to fight for the Royalist cause; the majority were killed at the Battle of Wigan Lane in 1651. In 1779, the Manx Fencible Corps, a fencible regiment of three companies, was raised; it was disbanded in 1783 at the end of the American War of Independence. Later, the Royal Manx Fencibles was raised at the time of the French Revolutionary Wars and Napoleonic Wars. The 1st Battalion (of 3 companies) was raised in 1793. A 2nd Battalion (of 10 companies) was raised in 1795, and it saw action during the Irish Rebellion of 1798. The regiment was disbanded in 1802. A third body of Manx Fencibles was raised in 1803 to defend the island during the Napoleonic Wars and to assist the Revenue. It was disbanded in 1811. The Isle of Man Home Guard was raised during the Second World War for home defence. In 2015 a multi-capability recruiting and training unit of the British Army Reserve was established in Douglas.

Manxman status

There is no citizenship of the Isle of Man as such; Isle of Man residents are entitled to British citizenship and can obtain a full UK British passport or British Isle of Man passport.

The Passport Office, Isle of Man, Douglas, accepts and processes applications for the Lieutenant Governor of the Isle of Man, who is formally responsible for issuing Isle of Man–issued British passports, titled "British Islands – Isle of Man.  The powers conferred on the UK Secretary of State by the British Nationality Act 1981 extend to and are exercised in the Isle of Man by the Lieutenant Governor.

Isle of Man-issued British passports can presently be issued to any British citizen resident in the Isle of Man, and also to British citizens who have a qualifying close personal connection to the Isle of Man, but are now resident either in the UK or in either one of the two other Crown Dependencies.

European Union 

The Isle of Man was never part of the European Union, nor did it have a special status, and thus it did not take part in the 2016 referendum on the UK's EU membership. However, Protocol 3 of the UK's Act of Accession to the Treaty of Rome included the Isle of Man within the EU's customs area, allowing for trade in Manx goods without tariffs throughout the EU. As it was not part of the EU's internal market, there are still limitations on the movement of capital, services and labour.

EU citizens were entitled to travel and reside, but not work, in the island without restriction. British citizens with Manxman status were under the same circumstances and restrictions as any other non-EU European relating country to work in the EU.

The political and diplomatic impacts of Brexit on the island are still uncertain. The UK confirmed that the Crown Dependencies' positions were included in the Brexit negotiations. The Brexit withdrawal agreement explicitly included the Isle of Man in its territorial scope, but makes no other mention of it. The island's government website stated that after the end of the implementation period, the Isle of Man's relationship with the EU would depend on the agreement reached between the UK and the EU on their future relationship.

Commonwealth of Nations 
The Isle of Man is not a member of the Commonwealth of Nations. By virtue of its relationship with the United Kingdom, it takes part in several Commonwealth institutions, including the Commonwealth Parliamentary Association and the Commonwealth Games. The Government of the Isle of Man has made calls for a more integrated relationship with the Commonwealth, including more direct representation and enhanced participation in Commonwealth organisations and meetings, including Commonwealth Heads of Government Meetings. The Chief Minister of the Isle of Man has said: "A closer connection with the Commonwealth itself would be a welcome further development of the island's international relationships."

Politics 

Most Manx politicians stand for election as independents rather than as representatives of political parties. Although political parties do exist, their influence is not nearly as strong as in the United Kingdom.

There are three political parties in the Isle of Man:
 The Liberal Vannin Party (established 2006) has one seat in the House of Keys; it promotes greater Manx autonomy and more accountability in government.
 The Manx Labour Party is active, and for much of the 20th century had several MHKs. Currently (since the 2021 general election) there are 2 MLP members in the House of Keys, both of whom are women. 
 The Isle of Man Green Party was established in 2016, but currently only has representation at local government level.

There are also a number of pressure groups on the island. Mec Vannin advocate the establishment of a sovereign republic. The Positive Action Group campaign for three key elements to be introduced into the governance of the island: open accountable government, rigorous control of public finances, and a fairer society.

Local government 

Local government on the Isle of Man is based partly on the island's 17 ancient parishes. There are four types of local authorities:
 a corporation for the Borough of Douglas, and bodies of commissioners for the town districts of Castletown, Peel and Ramsey
 the districts of Kirk Michael and Onchan
 the village districts of Port Erin and Port St Mary
 the 13 parish districts (those historic parishes, or combinations or parts of them, which do not fall within the districts previously mentioned).

Each of these districts has its own body of commissioners.

LGBT rights 

The Isle of Man was the last place in the British Isles to legalise same-sex sexual activity. While it had been legal in England since 1967, it remained illegal in the Isle of Man until 1992.

The Isle of Man's Chief Minister Howard Quayle has issued an "unqualified apology" to gay men convicted of same-sex offences under previous Manx laws.

Public services

Education 

Public education is overseen by the Department of Education, Sport & Culture. Thirty-two primary schools, five secondary schools and the University College Isle of Man function under the department.

Health 

Two-thirds of residents of Mann are overweight or obese, four in ten are physically inactive, one-quarter are binge drinkers, one in twelve smoke cigarettes, and about 15% are in poor general health. Healthcare is provided via a public health scheme by Department of Health and Social Care for residents and visitors from the UK.

Crime 
The Crime Severity Rate in Mann, which largely measures crimes directed against persons or property, remains substantially less than that in the United Kingdom, although the rate of violent crime has been increasing in recent years. Most violent crime is associated with the trade in illegal drugs.

The Government of Mann has laid out a strategy entailing a "whole-Island approach" to address the serious problems of money laundering, financial crime, and terrorism financing.

Emergency services 
The Isle of Man Government maintains five emergency services. These are:
 Isle of Man Constabulary (police)
 Isle of Man Coastguard
 Isle of Man Fire and Rescue Service
 Isle of Man Ambulance Service
 Isle of Man Civil Defence Corps

All of these services are controlled directly by the Department of Home Affairs of the Isle of Man Government, and are independent of the United Kingdom. Nonetheless, the Isle of Man Constabulary voluntarily submits to inspection by the British inspectorate of police, and the Isle of Man Coastguard contracts His Majesty's Coastguard (UK) for air-sea rescue operations.

Crematorium
The island's sole crematorium is located in Glencrutchery Road, Douglas, and is operated by the Douglas Borough Council. Usually staffed by four, in March 2020 an increase of staff to 12 was announced by the Council leader, responding to the threat of the COVID-19 pandemic, which could require more staff.

Economy 

The Isle of Man has no capital gains tax, wealth tax, stamp duty, or inheritance tax and a top rate of income tax of 20%. A tax cap is in force: the maximum amount of tax payable by an individual is £200,000 or £400,000 for couples choosing to have their incomes jointly assessed. Personal income is assessed and taxed on a worldwide income basis rather than a remittance basis. This means that all income earned throughout the world is assessable for Manx tax rather than only income earned in or brought into the island. The standard rate of corporation tax for residents and non-residents is 0%. Retail business profits above £500,000 and banking business income are taxed at 10%, and rental (or other) income from land and buildings situated on the Isle of Man is taxed at 20%.

Mann's low corporate tax burden and absence of public registries of corporate ownership provides tax avoidance and tax evasion strategies for individuals and corporations, resulting in a large influx of funds from those in pursuit of tax advantage and financial confidentiality. The relative importance of agriculture, fishing and tourism, the former mainstays of the Manx economy, has accordingly declined. As is typical of the low-tax crown dependencies, Mann's economy features financial services, shell corporations for high-technology companies, online gambling and online gaming, cinema production, and tax havens for high net worth individuals. These activities have brought some high-income jobs to Mann, as hundreds of local residents serve as “straw man" directors and shareholders of shell companies. Similar schemes provide a means for high net worth individuals to reduce their tax obligations and to shield their financial dealings from public scrutiny. As described in the Paradise Papers, the Isle of Man economy features extensive illegal economic activity including tax evasion, money laundering from drug sales, money transfers from weapons sales, and looting of public treasuries of other nation states (particularly Russia). These funds are mostly funneled into the London financial markets. There has been an effort to regulate these activities, though the impact of legal measures instituted by the Isle of Man government remains uncertain.  Online gambling sites provided about 10% of the Mann government's revenue in 2014.

The Isle of Man Department for Enterprise manages the diversified economy in 12 key sectors. The largest sectors by GNP are insurance and eGambling with 17% of GNP each, followed by ICT and banking with 9% each. The 2016 census lists 41,636 total employed. The largest sectors by employment are "medical and health", "financial and business services", construction, retail and public administration. Manufacturing, focused on aerospace and the food and drink industry, employs almost 2000 workers and contributes about 5% of gross domestic product (GDP). The sector provides laser optics, industrial diamonds, electronics, plastics and aerospace precision engineering. Tourism, agriculture, and fishing, once the mainstays of the economy, now make very little contributions to the island's GDP. The unemployment rate on Man is less than 1%.

Trade takes place mostly with the United Kingdom. The island is in customs union with the UK, and related revenues are pooled and shared under the Common Purse Agreement. This means that the Isle of Man cannot have the lower excise revenues on alcohol and other goods that are enjoyed in the Channel Islands.

The Manx government promotes island locations for making films by offering financial support. Since 1995, over 100 films have been made on the island. Most recently the island has taken a much wider strategy to attract the general digital media industry in film, television, video and esports.

The Isle of Man Government Lottery operated from 1986 to 1997. Since 2 December 1999 the island has participated in the United Kingdom National Lottery. The island is the only jurisdiction outside the United Kingdom where it is possible to play the UK National Lottery. Since 2010 it has also been possible for projects in the Isle of Man to receive national lottery Good Causes Funding. The good causes funding is distributed by the Manx Lottery Trust. Tynwald receives the 12% lottery duty for tickets sold in the island.

Tourist numbers peaked in the first half of the 20th century, prior to the boom in cheap travel to Southern Europe that also saw the decline of tourism in many similar English seaside resorts. The Isle of Man tourism board has recently invested in "Dark Sky Discovery" sites to diversify its tourism industry. It is expected that dark skies will generally be nominated by the public across the UK. However, the Isle of Man tourism board tasked someone from their team to nominate 27 places on the island as a civil task. This cluster of the highest quality "Milky Way" sites is now well promoted within the island. This government push has effectively given the island a headstart in the number of recognised Dark Sky sites. However, this has created a distorted view when compared to the UK where this is not promoted on a national scale. There, Dark Sky sites are expected to be nominated over time by the public across a full range of town, city and countryside locations rather than en masse by government departments.

In 2017 an office of The International Stock Exchange was opened to provide a boost for the island's finance industry.

Communications 

The main telephone provider on the Isle of Man is Manx Telecom. The island has two mobile operators: Manx Telecom, previously known as Manx Pronto, and Sure. Cloud9 operated as a third mobile operator on the island for a short time, but has since withdrawn.

Broadband internet services are available through four local providers: Wi-Manx, Domicilium, Manx Computer Bureau and Manx Telecom. The island does not have its own ITU country code, but is accessed via the British country code (+44), and the island's telephone numbers are part of the British telephone numbering plan, with local dialling codes 01624 for landlines and 07524, 07624 and 07924 for mobiles. Calls to the island from the UK however, are generally charged differently from those within the UK, and may or may not be included in any "inclusive minutes" packages.

In 1996, the Isle of Man Government obtained permission to use the .im national top-level domain (TLD), and has ultimate responsibility for its use. The main is managed from day to day by Domicilium, an island-based internet service provider. In December 2007, the Manx Electricity Authority and its telecommunications subsidiary, e-llan Communications, commissioned the laying of a new fibre-optic link that connects the island to a worldwide fibre-optic network. In August 2021 it was reported that Elon Musk's satellite internet service, Starlink, had been granted a licence to operate from a ground station on the island.

The Isle of Man has three radio stations: Manx Radio, Energy FM and 3FM.

There is no insular television service, but local transmitters retransmit British mainland digital broadcasts via the free-to-air digital terrestrial service Freeview. The Isle of Man is served by BBC North West for BBC One and BBC Two television services, and ITV Granada for ITV.

Many television services are available by satellite, such as Sky, and Freesat from the group of satellites at 28.2° East, as well as services from a range of other satellites around Europe such as the Astra satellites at 19.2° east and Hot Bird.

The Isle of Man has three newspapers, all weeklies, and all owned by Isle of Man Newspapers, a division of the Edinburgh media company Johnston Press. The Isle of Man Courier (distribution 36,318) is free and distributed to homes on the island. The other two newspapers are Isle of Man Examiner (circulation 13,276) and the Manx Independent (circulation 12,255).

Postal services are the responsibility of the Isle of Man Post Office, which took over from the UK's General Post Office in 1973.

Transport 

There is a comprehensive bus network, operated by the government-owned bus operator Bus Vannin.

The Isle of Man Sea Terminal in Douglas has regular ferries to and from Heysham and to and from Liverpool, with a more restricted timetable operating in winter. The two vessels are Manannan and Ben My Chree. The latter is due to be replaced with a new vessel arriving in 2022 made by Hyundai; it was named Manxman by the public in mid 2020. There are also limited summer-only services to and from Belfast and Dublin. The Dublin route also operates at Christmas. At the time of the Isle of Man TT a limited number of sailings operate to and from Larne in Northern Ireland. All ferries are operated by the Isle of Man Steam Packet Company.

The only commercial airport on the island is the Isle of Man Airport at Ronaldsway. There are direct scheduled and chartered flights to numerous airports in the United Kingdom and Ireland.

There is no overriding national speed limit; only local speed limits are set, and some roads have no speed limit. Rules about reckless driving and most other driving regulations are enforced in a similar way to the UK. There is a requirement for regular vehicle examinations for some vehicles (similar to the MoT test in the UK).

The island used to have an extensive narrow-gauge railway system, both steam-operated and electric, but the majority of the steam railway tracks were taken out of service many years ago, and the track removed. , there is a steam railway between Douglas and Port Erin, an electric railway between Douglas and Ramsey and an electric mountain railway which climbs Snaefell.

One of the oldest operating horse tram services is located on the sea front in the capital, Douglas. It was founded in 1876.

Space commerce 
The Isle of Man has become a centre for emerging private space travel companies. A number of the competitors in the Google Lunar X Prize, a $30 million competition for the first privately funded team to send a robot to the Moon, are based on the island. The team summit for the X Prize was held on the island in October 2010. In January 2011 two research space stations owned by Excalibur Almaz arrived on the island and were kept in an aircraft hangar at the airfield at the former RAF Jurby near Jurby.

Electricity supply 
The electricity supply on the Isle of Man is run by the Manx Utilities Authority. The Isle of Man is connected to Great Britain's national grid by a 40 MW alternating current link (Isle of Man to England Interconnector). There are also hydroelectric, natural gas and diesel generators. The government has also planned a 700 MW offshore wind farm, roughly half the size of Walney Wind Farm.

Gas supply 

Gas for lighting and heating has been supplied to users on the Isle of Man since 1836, firstly as town gas, then as liquefied petroleum gas (LPG); since 2003 natural gas has been available. The future use of hydrogen as a supplementary or substitute fuel is being studied.

Cannabis cultivation 
In June 2021, the law prohibiting commercial cultivation of cannabis on Ellan Vannin was repealed, and the government of Mann, for the first time, offered licences for production and export of cannabis. In February 2022, Mann resident and local billionaire John Whittaker, through his firm Peel NRE, proposed to spend US$136 million for the construction of warmhouses for cannabis cultivation, and research facilities, and to develop the business. It was announced that zoning permits had been granted for development of the facility. Although the availability of medical cannabis is heavily restricted within the U.K., there has been an effort to develop the cannabis industry on the Channel Islands of Jersey and Guernsey.

Culture 

The Manx are a Celtic nation.

The culture of the Isle of Man is often promoted as being influenced by its Celtic and, to a lesser extent, its Norse origins. Proximity to the UK, popularity as a UK tourist destination in Victorian times, and immigration from Britain have all meant that the cultures of Great Britain have been influential at least since Revestment. Revival campaigns have attempted to preserve the surviving vestiges of Manx culture after a long period of Anglicisation, and there has been significantly increased interest in the Manx language, history and musical tradition.

Language 

The official languages of the Isle of Man are English and Manx. Manx has traditionally been spoken but has been stated to be "critically endangered". However, it now has a growing number of young speakers.

Manx is a Goidelic Celtic language and is one of a number of insular Celtic languages spoken in the British Isles. Manx has been officially recognised as a legitimate autochthonous regional language under the European Charter for Regional or Minority Languages, ratified by the United Kingdom on 27 March 2001 on behalf of the Isle of Man government.

Manx is closely related to Irish and Scottish Gaelic, but is orthographically sui generis.

As in Irish and Scottish Gaelic, the concepts of "evening" and "afternoon" are referred to with one word.

In the 2011 Isle of Man census, approximately 1,800 residents could read, write, and speak the Manx language.

Symbols 

For centuries, the island's symbol has been the so-called "three legs of Mann", a triskelion of three legs conjoined at the thigh. The Manx triskelion, which dates back with certainty to the late 13th century, is of uncertain origin. It has been suggested that its origin lies in Sicily, an island which has been associated with the triskelion since ancient times.

The symbol appears in the island's official flag and official coat of arms, as well as its currency. The Manx triskelion may be reflected in the island's motto, Quocunque jeceris stabit, which appears as part of the island's coat of arms. The Latin motto translates as "whichever way you throw, it will stand" or "whithersoever you throw it, it will stand". It dates to the late 17th century when it is known to have appeared on the island's coinage. It has also been suggested that the motto originally referred to the poor quality of coinage which was common at the time—as in "however it is tested it will pass".

The ragwort or cushag has been referred to as the Manx national flower.

Religion 

The predominant religious tradition of the Isle of Man is Christianity, adhered to by 54.7% of the Manx according to the 2021 census. At the same time, 43.8% of the population had no religion, 0.5% adhered to Islam, 0.5% to Buddhism, 0.4% to Hinduism, 0.2% to Judaism, and 0.2% to other religions.

Before the Protestant Reformation, the island had a long history as part of the unified Catholic Church, and in the years following the Reformation, the religious authorities on the island, and later the population of the island, accepted the religious authority of the British monarchy, Anglicanism and the Church of England. The Isle of Man also came under the influence of Irish religious tradition. The island forms a separate diocese called Sodor and Man, which in the distant past comprised the medieval kingdom of Man and the Scottish isles ("Suðreyjar" in Old Norse). Nowadays, it consists of sixteen parishes, and since 1541 has been part of the Province of York.

Other Christian denominations and other religions also operate on the Isle of Man. The second largest denomination is the Methodist Church, whose Isle of Man District is close in numbers to the Anglican diocese. Then, there are eight Catholic parish churches, included in the Catholic Archdiocese of Liverpool, as well as a presence of Eastern Orthodox Christians. Additionally, there are five Baptist churches, four Pentecostal churches, the Salvation Army, a ward of the Church of Jesus Christ of Latter-day Saints, two congregations of Jehovah's Witnesses, two United Reformed churches, as well as other Christian churches.

The Manx Muslim community has a mosque in Douglas, and Jews also have a history on the island. In 2022, the island's first Buddhist temple was established in Baldrine.

Myth, legend, and folklore 

In Manx mythology, the island was ruled by the sea god Manannán, who would draw his misty cloak around the island to protect it from invaders. One of the principal folk theories about the origin of the name Mann is that it is named after Manannán.

In the Manx tradition of folklore, there are many stories of mythical creatures and characters.

The Isle of Man is also said to be home to fairies, known locally as "the little folk" or "themselves". There is a famous Fairy Bridge, and it is said to be bad luck if one fails to wish the fairies good morning or afternoon when passing over it. It used to be a tradition to leave a coin on the bridge to ensure good luck.

An old Irish story tells how Lough Neagh was formed when Ireland's legendary giant Fionn mac Cumhaill (commonly anglicised to Finn McCool) ripped up a portion of the land and tossed it at a Scottish rival. He missed and the chunk of earth landed in the Irish Sea, thus creating the island.

Peel Castle has been proposed as a possible location of the Arthurian Avalon or as the location of the Grail Castle, site of Lancelot's encounter with the sword bridge of King Maleagant.

One of the most oft-repeated myths is that people found guilty of witchcraft were rolled down Slieau Whallian, a hill near St John's, in a barrel. However this is a 19th-century legend derived from a Scottish legend, which in turn comes from a German legend. Separately, a witchcraft museum was opened at the Witches Mill, Castletown in 1951. There has never actually been a witches' coven on that site; the myth was only created with the opening of the museum. However, there has been a strong tradition of herbalism and the use of charms to prevent and cure illness and disease in people and animals.

Music 

The music of the Isle of Man reflects Celtic, Norse and other influences, including from its neighbours, Scotland, Ireland, England and Wales. A wide range of music is performed on the island, such as rock, blues, jazz and pop.

Its traditional folk music has undergone a revival since the 1970s, starting with a music festival called  in Ramsey. This was part of a general revival of the Manx language and culture after the death of the last native speaker of Manx in 1974.

Orchestral and song composer Haydn Wood grew up on the Isle of Man, moving there in 1885, aged three years old. The island and its folk tunes inspired Wood's music, resulting in the compositions Manx Rhapsody (Mylecharaine), Manx Countryside Sketches, Manx Overture, and the 1933 tone poem  (Manx for "Dear Isle of Man"), based on four Manx folk tunes and scored for wind band. His older brother Harry Wood (1868-1939) was also a musician: a violinist, composer and conductor who became known as "Manxland's King of Music",

The Isle of Man was mentioned in the Who song "Happy Jack" as the homeland of the song's titular character, who is always in a state of ecstasy, no matter what happens to him. The song 'The Craic was 90 in the Isle of Man' by Christy Moore describes a lively visit during the Island's tourism heyday. The Island is also the birthplace of Maurice, Robin and Barry Gibb, of the Bee Gees; a bronze statue of the trio was unveiled on Douglas promenade in July 2021.

Food 
In the past, the basic national dish of the island was spuds and herrin, boiled potatoes and herring. This plain dish was supported by the subsistence farmers of the island, who for centuries crofted the land and fished the sea. Chips, cheese and gravy, a dish similar to poutine, is found in most of the island's fast-food outlets, and consists of thick cut chips, covered in shredded Cheddar cheese and topped with a thick gravy. However, as of the Isle of Man Food & Drink Festival 2018, queenies have been crowned the Manx national dish  with many restaurants, hotels and pubs serving locally farmed queen scallops.

Seafood has traditionally accounted for a large proportion of the local diet. Although commercial fishing has declined in recent years, local delicacies include Manx kippers (smoked herring) which are produced by the smokeries in Peel on the west coast of the island, albeit mainly from North Sea herring these days. The smokeries also produce other specialities including smoked salmon and bacon.

Crab, lobster and scallops are commercially fished, and the queen scallop (queenies) is regarded as a particular delicacy, with a light, sweet flavour. Cod, ling and mackerel are often angled for the table, and freshwater trout and salmon can be taken from the local rivers and lakes, supported by the government fish hatchery at Cornaa on the east coast.

Cattle, sheep, pigs and poultry are all commercially farmed; Manx lamb from the hill farms is a popular dish. The Loaghtan, the indigenous breed of Manx sheep, has a rich, dark meat that has found favour with chefs, featuring in dishes on the BBC's MasterChef series.

Manx cheese has also found some success, featuring smoked and herb-flavoured varieties, and is stocked by many of the UK's supermarket chains. Manx cheese took bronze medals in the 2005 British Cheese Awards, and sold 578 tonnes over the year. Manx cheddar has been exported to Canada where it is available in some supermarkets.

Beer is brewed on a commercial scale by Okells Brewery, which was established in 1850 and is the island's largest brewer; and also by Bushy's Brewery and the Hooded Ram Brewery. The Isle of Man's Pure Beer Act of 1874, which resembles the German Reinheitsgebot, is still in effect: under this Act, brewers may only use water, malt, sugar and hops in their brews.

Sport 

The Isle of Man is represented as a nation in the Commonwealth Games and the Island Games and hosted the IV Commonwealth Youth Games in 2011. Manx athletes have won three gold medals at the Commonwealth Games, including the one by cyclist Mark Cavendish in 2006 in the Scratch race. The Island Games were first held on the island in 1985, and again in 2001. In 2019, FC Isle of Man was founded and is a North West Counties League team.

Isle of Man teams and individuals participate in many sports both on and off the island including rugby union, football, gymnastics, field hockey, netball, taekwondo, bowling, obstacle course racing and cricket. The FC Isle of Man will compete in the North West Counties Football League Premier Division in the next league campaign. It being an island, many types of watersports are also popular with residents.

Motorcycle racing 

The main international event associated with the island is the Isle of Man Tourist Trophy race, colloquially known as "The TT", which began in 1907. It takes place in late May and early June. The TT is now an international road racing event for motorcycles, which used to be part of the World Championship, and is long considered to be one of the "greatest motorcycle sporting events of the world". Taking place over a two-week period, it has become a festival for motorcycling culture, makes a huge contribution to the island's economy and has become part of Manx identity. For many, the Isle carries the title "road racing capital of the world".

The Manx Grand Prix is a separate motorcycle event for amateurs and private entrants that uses the same  Snaefell Mountain Course in late August and early September.

In the 1990s, SEGA released an arcade game called Manx TT Superbike, based on the motorcycle races.

Cammag 

Prior to the introduction of football in the 19th century, Cammag was the island's traditional sport. It is similar to the Irish hurling and the Scottish game of shinty. Nowadays there is an annual match at St John's.

Theatre and cinema 

Built in 1899, to the designs of architect Frank Matcham, and restored in 1976 to its original splendor, the government-owned Gaiety Theatre and Opera House on the Douglas Promenade presents plays, musicals, concerts and comedy shows year-round. Within the Gaiety Theatre Complex, the Broadway Cinema has a capacity of 154 and doubles as a conference venue.

The Palace Cinema is located next to the derelict Castle Mona hotel and is operated by the Sefton Group. It has two screens: Screen One holds 293 customers, while Screen Two is smaller with a capacity of just 95. It was extensively refurbished in August 2011.

Fauna 

Two domestic animals are specifically connected to the Isle of Man, though they are also found elsewhere.

The Manx cat is a breed of cat noted for its genetic mutation that causes it to have a shortened tail. The length of this tail can range from a few inches, known as a "stumpy", to being completely nonexistent, or "rumpy". Manx cats display a range of colours and usually have somewhat longer hind legs compared to most cats. The cats have been used as a symbol of the Isle of Man on coins and stamps and at one time the Manx government operated a breeding centre to ensure the continuation of the breed.

The Manx Loaghtan sheep is a breed native to the island. It has dark brown wool and four, or sometimes six, horns. The meat is considered to be a delicacy. There are several flocks on the island and others have been started in England and Jersey.

A more recent arrival on the island is the red-necked wallaby, which is now established on the island following an escape from the Wildlife Park. The local police report an increasing number of wallaby-related calls.

There are also many feral goats in Garff, a matter which was raised in Tynwald Court in January 2018.

In March 2016, the Isle of Man became the first entire territory to be adopted into UNESCO's Network of Biosphere Reserves.

Demographics

Age structure
0–14 years: 16.27% (male 7,587, female 6,960)
15–24 years: 11.3% (male 5,354, female 4,750)
25–54 years: 38.48% (male 17,191, female 17,217)
55–64 years: 13.34% (male 6,012, female 5,919)
65 years and over: 20.6% (male 8,661, female 9,756) (2018 est.)

Population density 

131 people/km2 (339 people/sq mi) (2005 est.)

Sex ratio

Infant mortality rate
Total: 4 deaths/1,000 live births
Male: 4 deaths/1,000 live births
Female: 4 deaths/1,000 live births (2018 est.)
Country comparison to the world: 191

Life expectancy at birth
 Total population: 81.4 years
 Male: 79.6 years
 Female: 83.3 years (2018 est.)
 Country comparison to the world: 29
 Total fertility rate: 1.92 children born/woman (2018 est.)

Nationality
 noun: Manxman (men), Manxwoman (women)
 adjective: Manx

Ethnicity
 White: 94.7%
 Asian: 3.1%
 Black: 0.6%
 Other: 0.6%
 Mixed: 1.0%

Religion
 Christianity: 54.7%
 No religion: 43.8%
 Buddhism: 0.5%
 Islam: 0.5%
 Hinduism: 0.4%
 Judaism: 0.2%

Country of birth
 Isle of Man: 49.6%
 United Kingdom: 38.3%
 Another country: 12.1%

Climate 
The Isle of Man has a temperate oceanic climate (Köppen Cfb). Average rainfall is higher than averaged over the territory of the British Isles, because the Isle of Man is far enough from Ireland for the prevailing south-westerly winds to accumulate moisture. Average rainfall is highest at Snaefell, where it is around  a year. At lower levels it can be around  a year. In drier spots, the Isle of Man is sunnier than either Ireland or the majority of England at 1,651 hours per year at the official Ronaldsway station. Due to the moderate surface temperatures of the Irish Sea, the island does not receive bursts of heat that sometimes can hit Northern England. The stable water temperature also means that air frost is rare, averaging just ten occasions per year.

On 10 May 2019 Chief Minister Howard Quayle stated that the Isle of Man Government recognises that a state of emergency exists due to the threat of anthropogenic climate change.

See also 

 History of the Isle of Man
 Outline of the Isle of Man
 List of places in the Isle of Man
 United Kingdom–Crown Dependencies Customs Union
 Public holidays in the Isle of Man

Notes

References

Bibliography

Further reading

External links 

 Government of Isle of Man, covers many aspects of Manx life from fishing to financial regulation
 
 
 Isle of Man News
 Information on the work and duties of Members of the House of Keys
 Images of the Isle of Man at the English Heritage Archive

 

British Islands
British Isles
Isle
Isle
Isle of Man
Isle
Isle
Isle
Isle